January 12 - Eastern Orthodox liturgical calendar - January 14

All fixed commemorations below are observed on January 26 by Eastern Orthodox Churches on the Old Calendar.

For January 13, Orthodox churches using the Old Calendar commemorate the saints listed on December 31.

Feasts
 Afterfeast of the Theophany of Our Lord and Savior Jesus Christ.  (Serbian Calendar: Apodosis of the Theophany)

Saints
 Martyr Peter of Anium at Hieropolis (Peter Apselamus at Eleutheropolis) (c. 309)  (see also January 12,Martyr Peter Apselamus of Palestine. OCA - Lives of the Saints. and October 14)
 Martyrs Hermylus the Deacon and Stratonicus, at Belgrade (315)
 Martyr Athanasius.
 Martyrs Pachomius and Papyrinus, by drowning.
 Saint Jacob of Nisibis, Bishop of Nisibis, the "Moses of Mesopotamia"  (c. 350)

Pre-Schism Western saints
 Saint Potitus, a boy venerated as a martyr near Naples in Italy (c. 138 - 161)  (see also: July 1)
 Saint Andrew of Trier, twelfth Bishop of Trier in Germany, sometimes listed as a martyr (235) 
 Forty soldier-martyrs of Rome, who suffered on the Via Lavicana, under Gallienus (262)
 Saint Agricius of Trier (Agrecius, Agritius), Bishop of Trier in Germany, took part in the Council of Arles in 314 (c. 333)
 Saint Hilary of Poitiers (Hilary of Pictavium), Bishop of Poitiers (368)
 Saint Viventius, an eastern priest who travelled to the West and attached himself to St Hilary of Poitiers, ended his life as a hermit (c. 400)
 Saint Erbin of Dumnonia (Ervan, Erbyn, Erme), King of Dumnonia (now Cornwall and Devon) and saint of Wales (c. 480)
 Saint Remigius of Rheims, Apostle to the Franks (437–533), and Bishop of Rheims from 459 (533)
 Saint Elian (Eilan, Allan), Missionary to Cornwall, England (6th century)  (see also: January 12 - Greek)
 Saint Kentigern  (Kentigern Mungo, Kentigern of Glasgow), Apostle of the Brythonic Kingdom of Strathclyde and patron saint and founder of the city of Glasgow (614)  (see also January 14 - Russian)
 Saint Enogatus, fifth successor of St Malo as Bishop of Aleth in Brittany (631)
 Saints Gumesindus and Servusdei, two martyrs, one a parish-priest, the other a monk, in Cordoba in Spain under Abderrahman II (852)
 Saint Berno of Cluny, first Abbot of Cluny and initiator of the Cluniac reforms which spread across Europe (927)

Post-Schism Orthodox saints
 Venerable Maximus Kavsokalyvites of Mount Athos (1354)
 St. Irenarchus the Recluse, of Rostov (1616)
 Venerable Eleazar of Anzersk Island at Solovki (1656)
St. Jeremias I, Patriarch of Constantinople (1546)

Other commemorations
 Consecration of the monastery of the Prophet Elias - the so-called "Monastery of the Deep Stream" - in Triglia, Bithynia (10th century)

Icon gallery

Notes

References

Sources
 January 13/January 26. Orthodox Calendar (PRAVOSLAVIE.RU).
 January 26 / January 13. HOLY TRINITY RUSSIAN ORTHODOX CHURCH (A parish of the Patriarchate of Moscow).
 January 13. OCA - The Lives of the Saints.
 The Autonomous Orthodox Metropolia of Western Europe and the Americas (ROCOR). St. Hilarion Calendar of Saints for the year of our Lord 2004. St. Hilarion Press (Austin, TX). p. 7.
 January 13. Latin Saints of the Orthodox Patriarchate of Rome.
 The Roman Martyrology. Transl. by the Archbishop of Baltimore. Last Edition, According to the Copy Printed at Rome in 1914. Revised Edition, with the Imprimatur of His Eminence Cardinal Gibbons. Baltimore: John Murphy Company, 1916. pp. 13–14.
Greek Sources
 Great Synaxaristes:  13 ΙΑΝΟΥΑΡΙΟΥ. ΜΕΓΑΣ ΣΥΝΑΞΑΡΙΣΤΗΣ.
  Συναξαριστής. 13 Ιανουαρίου. ECCLESIA.GR. (H ΕΚΚΛΗΣΙΑ ΤΗΣ ΕΛΛΑΔΟΣ). 
Russian Sources
  26 января (13 января). Православная Энциклопедия под редакцией Патриарха Московского и всея Руси Кирилла (электронная версия). (Orthodox Encyclopedia - Pravenc.ru).
  13 января (ст.ст.) 26 января 2013 (нов. ст.). Русская Православная Церковь Отдел внешних церковных связей. (DECR).

January in the Eastern Orthodox calendar